Charlotte "Lotte" Reiniger (2 June 1899 – 19 June 1981) was a German film director and the foremost pioneer of silhouette animation. Her best known films are The Adventures of Prince Achmed, from 1926, the first feature-length animated film, and Papageno (1935). Reiniger is also noted for having devised, from 1923 to 1926, the first form of a multiplane camera. Reiniger worked on more than 40 films throughout her career.

Biography

Early life 
Lotte Reiniger was born in the Charlottenburg district of Berlin on 2 June 1899 to Carl Reiniger and Eleonore Lina Wilhelmine Rakette. Here, she studied at Charlottenburger Waldschule, the first open-air school, where she learned the art of scherenschnitte, the German art of silhouette, inspired by the ancient Chinese art of paper cutting and silhouette puppetry. As a child, she became fascinated with this Chinese art of paper cutting of silhouette puppetry, and even built her own puppet theatre so that she could put on shows for her family and friends. Throughout this time in her life is when she began to develop a love of theater and cultivated her then dreams of becoming a play actress. Reiniger translated her love of acting to her silhouette puppetry in order to create her unique and fanciful recreations of her favorite plays and fairytales. 

As a teenager, Reiniger developed a love of cinema, first with the films of Georges Méliès for their special effects, then the films of the actor and director Paul Wegener, a German actor, writer, and film director known for his pioneering role in German expressionist cinema and The Golem (1920). In 1915, her love of theater led Reiniger to her future mentor and colleague when she attended a lecture by Wegener that focused on the fantastic possibilities of animation. Reiniger eventually convinced her parents to allow her to enroll in the acting group to which Wegener belonged, the Theatre of Max Reinhardt. She began by making costumes and props and working backstage for Wegener's play productions. She started making silhouette portraits of the her classmates and the actors around her, to which intrigued Paul Wegener and led to her future collaborations with the director. Soon enough she was making elaborate title cards for Wegener's films, many of which featured her silhouette animations.

Adulthood and success 
After a few years Reiniger began to take her filmmaking beyond the short title cards that she created for Paul Wegener's films. Once she began animating films of her own and showcasing narratives through her film style she notes there was no going back. Reiniger had begun her journey as a filmmaker and would pursue the art of story telling whatever it took. “There was peace for a short time; then came the film. I had refused to learn a profession, and I now had one desire – to make films at all costs.” In 1918, Reiniger animated wooden rats and created the animated intertitles for Wegener's Der Rattenfänger von Hameln (The Pied Piper of Hamelin). The success of this work got her admitted into the Institut für Kulturforschung (Institute for Cultural Research), an experimental animation and short-film studio. It was here that she met her future creative partner and husband (from 1921), Carl Koch, as well as other avant-garde artists including Hans Cürlis, Bertolt Brecht, and Berthold Bartosch.

The first film Reiniger directed was Das Ornament des verliebten Herzens (The Ornament of the Enamoured Heart, 1919), a five-minute piece involving two lovers and an ornament that reflects their moods. Even in her very first animated short film, the beautiful and graceful movements proved to be a great example of Reiniger's style and her talent for showcasing expression through movement. The film was very well received, and its success opened up many new connections for Reiniger in the animation industry. Not only did the film open up possibilities for Reiniger in the animation industry, but it began to gain her recognition as a filmmaker internationally, given the film's success overseas, particularly in the United States. Soon after The Ornament of The Enamoured Heart Reiniger went off to make plenty more short films and advertisements.

She made six short films over the next few years, all produced and photographed by her husband, including the fairytale animation Aschenputtel (1922), the Brother's Grimm telling of the well known tale, Cinderella. These shorts were interspersed with advertising films (the Julius Pinschewer advertising agency innovated ad films and sponsored a large number of abstract animators during the Weimar period) and special effects for various feature films—most famously a silhouette falcon for a dream sequence in Part One of Die Nibelungen by Fritz Lang. During this time, she found herself at the centre of a large group of ambitious German animators, including Bartosch, Hans Richter, Walter Ruttmann and Oskar Fischinger. Being amongst such big names in the German art scene Reiniger was able to truly establish a voice for herself as a female artist in the early twentieth century. It is through this period that viewers become able to truly see Reiniger's style and interest's take shape through her animations and subject choices.

In 1923, she was approached by Louis Hagen, who had bought a large quantity of raw film stock as an investment to fight the spiraling inflation of the period. Looking to invest in new talent and create innovative films, he asked her to do a feature-length animated film.  It was at this time that the idea to create The Adventures of Prince Ahmed into the first feature length animation was born. There was some difficulty that came with doing this, however because at the time very few people had thought of, let alone, attempted to create a feature length film. In fact, The Adventures of Prince Ahmed is currently the oldest known and restored feature length animated film available, contrary to the wider known belief that Walt Disney’s Snow White and The Seven Dwarfs was the oldest known feature length animation, however Walt Disney’s first success was filmed over a decade after Reiniger’s Prince Ahmed. There have been a couple of challenges to this status as there are reports that Argentine artist and director Quirino Cristiani’s film The Apostol(1917) is the oldest feature-length film. Unfortunately, no known copies of The Apostol have been found and restored.  Reiniger is quoted as saying "We had to think twice. This was a never heard of thing. Animated films were supposed to make people roar with laughter, and nobody had dared to entertain an audience with them for more than ten minutes. Everybody to whom we talked in the industry about the proposition was horrified." The result was The Adventures of Prince Achmed, completed in 1926, one of the first animated feature films, with a plot that is a pastiche of stories from One Thousand and One Nights. Although it failed to find a distributor for almost a year, once premiered in Paris (thanks to the support of Jean Renoir), it became a critical and popular success. Because of this delay, however, The Adventures of Prince Achmeds expressionistic style did not quite fit with the realism that was becoming popular in cinema in 1926. Reiniger uses lines that can almost be called "colorful" to represent the film's exotic locations. Today, The Adventures of Prince Achmed is thought to be one of the oldest surviving feature-length animated films, if not the oldest. It is also considered to be the first avant-garde full-length animated feature.

Reiniger, in devising a predecessor to the multiplane camera for certain effects, preceded Ub Iwerks and Walt Disney by a decade. Above her animation table, a camera with a manual shutter was placed in order to achieve this. She placed planes of glass to achieve a layered effect. The setup was then backlit. This camera setup was later invented simultaneously and innovated in cel animation. Reiniger wrote instructions on how to construct her "trick-table" in her book, Shadow puppets, shadow theatres, and shadow films. In addition to Reiniger's silhouette actors, Prince Achmed boasted dream-like backgrounds by Walter Ruttmann (her partner in the Die Nibelungen sequence) and Walter Türck, and a symphonic score by Wolfgang Zeller. Additional effects were added by Carl Koch and Berthold Bartosch.

Following the success of Prince Achmed, Reiniger was able to make a second feature. Doktor Dolittle und seine Tiere (Doctor Dolittle and his Animals, 1928) was based on the first of the English children's books by Hugh Lofting. The film tells of the good Doctor's voyage to Africa to help heal sick animals. It is currently available only in a television version with new music, voice-over narration and the images playing at too many frames per second. The score of this three-part film was composed by Kurt Weill, Paul Hindemith and Paul Dessau.

A year later, Reiniger co-directed her first live-action film with Rochus Gliese, Die Jagd nach dem Glück (The Pursuit of Happiness, 1929), a tale about a shadow-puppet troupe. The film starred Jean Renoir and Berthold Bartosch and included a 20-minute silhouette performance by Reiniger. Unfortunately, the film was completed just as sound came to Germany and release of the film was delayed until 1930 to dub in voices by different actors—the result being disappointing.

Reiniger attempted to make a third animated feature, inspired by Maurice Ravel's opera L'enfant et les sortilèges (The Child and the Bewitched Things, 1925), but was unable to clear all of the individual rights to Ravel's music, the libretto (by the novelist Colette), and an unexpected number of copyright holders. When Ravel died in 1937 the clearance became even more complex and Lotte finally abandoned the project, although she had designed sequences and animated some scenes to convince potential backers and the rights-holders.

Reiniger worked on several films with British poet, critic, and musician Eric Walter White, who wrote an early book-length essay on her work.

Flight from Germany and later life
With the rise of the Nazi Party, Reiniger and Koch decided to emigrate (both were involved in left-wing politics), but found that no other country would give them permanent visas. As a result, the couple spent the years 1933–1944 moving from country to country, staying as long as visas would allow. With the release of sound film, Reiniger and her husband began to work with music in relation to animation. They worked with film-makers Jean Renoir in Paris and Luchino Visconti in Rome. They managed to make 12 films during this period, the best-known being Carmen (1933) and Papageno (1935), both based on popular operas (Bizet's Carmen and Mozart's Die Zauberflöte). When World War II commenced they stayed with Visconti in Rome until 1944, then moved back to Berlin to take care of Reiniger's sick mother. Under the rule of Hitler, Reiniger was forced to make propaganda films for Germany. One of these films is called  (The Golden Goose, 1944). She had to work under stringent and limiting conditions to please the German state, which is why some of her work in this time period may appear creatively stifled.

In 1949, Reiniger and Koch moved to London, where she made a few short advertising films for John Grierson and his General Post Office Film Unit (later to be renamed the "Crown Film Unit").  1949, Lotte and Carl moved to London and worked for John Grierson and his General Post Office Film Unit. By 1953, Lotte had founded Primrose Production with Louis Hagen Jr. the son of the financier of Prince Achmed. With this company, Lotte made over a dozen short silhouette films based on Grimms’ Fairy Tales for the BBC and Telecasting America. Lotte continued to work on and off over the years, her last film being The Rose and the Ring, released in 1979.

While she was living in London in the early 1950s she became friends with Freddy Bloom, the chair of the National Deaf Children's Society and editor of quarterly magazine called "TALK", who asked her to design a logo. Reiniger responded by cutting out silhouettes of four children running up a hill. Freddy Bloom was amazed at her skill with the scissors—in a few moments she created about four different silhouettes of the children from black paper. One of them was used as cover design on the magazine TALK from 1956. The logo was used until the 1990s, when a design company was invited to revamp it. The result was a very minor modification, but this new design was dropped a few years later. In the early 1950s she was working at Beconsfield studios in Buckinghamshire. 

With Louis Hagen Jr. (the son of Reiniger's financier of Prince Achmed in Potsdam), they founded Primrose Productions in 1953 and, over the next two years, produced more than a dozen short silhouette films based on Grimms' Fairy Tales for the BBC and Telecasting America. Reiniger also provided illustrations for the 1953 book King Arthur and His Knights of the Round Table by Roger Lancelyn Green.

After a period of seclusion after her husband's death in 1963, renewed interest in her work resulted in Reiniger's return to Germany. She later visited the United States, and began making films again soon after. She made three more films, the last of which, Die vier Jahreszeiten, (The Four Seasons) was completed the year before she died.

Reiniger died in Dettenhausen, Germany, on 19 June 1981, at the age of 82.

Art style 
Reingier's art style was developed from her love of paper animation and the theater. Reiniger had a distinct art style in her animations that was very different from other artists in the time period of the 1920s and the 1930s, particularly in terms of characters.

In the 1920s especially, characters tended to rely on facial expressions to express emotions or action, while Reiniger's characters relied on gestures to display emotions or actions. Reiniger’s cutout animations had a fluid quality that expressed character’s emotions and actions in a way that was not possible through traditional silent film. This was due the unique way she shaped and animated her characters through the paper cutout techniques that she developed through practice. Considering that her paper animations were forced to rely on gestures and action due to the nature of the medium Reiniger was able to convey emotion that not even facial expressions or sound film could imitate. Thus is the intrigue of her creative genius and work. Because of this, Reiniger's characters are not usually anatomically correct, but they are able to express a fluidity which is very important to her style of expressionism. Although there are other animators in that time period that used these techniques, Reiniger stands out because she is able to accomplish this style using cutout animation. Reiniger's figures resemble stop-motion animation in the way that they move.

She also utilized the technique of metamorphosis often in her animations. This focus on transformation greatly benefits her tendency to work with fairytale stories. The Adventures of Prince Achmed specifically adapts fantastic elements to take advantage of animation to show things that could not be shown in reality. Reiniger considered animation's separation from the laws of the material plane to be one of the greatest strengths of the medium.

Reiniger's style also translated well to her usually chosen subject, Fairytales. At the time film did not have the technological advancements to create magical special effects, thus many fairytales that showcased extravagant magical events were not as desirable for filmmakers. However, through animation, such whimsical effects were possible through her paper animations. Her detailed settings and colourful backgrounds also translated well into her love of fairytale stories.

Influence 
Reiniger's black silhouettes would become a popular aesthetic to reference in films and art. Although all subsequent makers of animated fairy tales could be said to have been influenced by Reiniger, Bruno J. Böttge is probably the one who has made the most explicit references to her work.

Disney's Fantasia uses Reiniger's style in the beginning of the scene where Mickey Mouse is in the same shot as the live-action musicians, as well as in The Princess and the Frog during the musical number "Friends on the Other Side".

Reiniger's films were the first to move animation from solely comedic narratives. At the time, animated short films rarely had a narrative, and any narrative that they did have was shallow and only present in the film to support the character’s slapstick comedy. Throughout all of her films, both short and feature length, Reininger strives to portray serious narrative through the art of animation. Thus, gaining a much larger respect for the medium in the film industry.

Disney would also use a multiplane camera in its own movies, such as Snow White and the Seven Dwarfs, based on the technology that Reiniger originally developed.

Starting with the silhouette format in the 1989 television series Ciné si, French animator Michel Ocelot employs many of the techniques created by Reiniger, along with others of his own invention, in his silhouette film Princes et princesses.

Bram Stoker's Dracula briefly included a silhouetted scene in its opening a homage to early cinema technique like Reiniger's.

Reiniger's cut-out animation style was utilized in the credits of the 2004 film Lemony Snicket's A Series of Unfortunate Events.

In the 2010 film, Harry Potter and the Deathly Hallows – Part 1, animator Ben Hibon used Reiniger's style of animation in the short film titled "The Tale of the Three Brothers".

The animated series Steven Universe paid homage to the style of Reiniger's films in the episode "The Answer".

Legacy 
In (2017) The European Animation Awards created the Lotte Reiniger Lifetime Achievement Award in order to recognize individual's for their lifetime contribution to the art of animation in either producing, directing, animating, design, writing, voice acting, sound and sound effects, technical work, music, professional teaching, or for other endeavors which exhibit an outstanding contribution to excellence in animation. The very first recipient of this award was Richard Williams, the known animation director of Who Framed Roger Rabbit and the extremely beloved animation handbook The Animator's Survival Kit.

Reiniger served to be one of the first filmmakers in the 20th century to attempt a portrayal of the queer experience with a pair of openly gay lovers in her film The Adventures of Prince Ahmed. Although this was censored in the version of the film that was distributed to theaters, Reiniger herself was outspoken on her motivation to destigmatize homosexual realities in the world of film. “I knew lots of homosexual men and women from the film and theater world in Berlin, and saw how they suffered from stigmatization.”

The municipal museum in Tübingen holds much of her original materials and hosts a permanent exhibition, "The World in Light and Shadow: Silhouette, shadow theatre, silhouette film". The Filmmuseum Düsseldorf also holds many materials of Lotte Reiniger's work, including her animation table, and a part of the permanent exhibition is dedicated to her. Collections relating to her are also held at the BFI National Archive.

On June 2, 2016, Google celebrated Reiniger's 117th birthday with a Google Doodle about her.

The Lottie file format for vector animation is named after her.

Awards 

 1936 – Venice Film Festival: Mussolini Cup for Best Foreign Film (Nominee)
 1972 – German Film Awards: Honorary Award (Winner)
 1972– Deutscher Filmpries

Filmography 

 1919 – The Ornament of the Lovestruck Heart
 1920 – Amor and the Steady Loving Couple
 1921 – The Star of Bethlehem
 1922 – Sleeping Beauty
 1922 – The Flying Suitcase
 1922 – The Secret of the Marquise
 1922 – Cinderella
 1926 – The Adventures of Prince Achmed (feature)
 1927 – The Chinese Nightingale
 1928 – Dr. Dolittle and His Animals (3 parts: "The Journey to Africa", "The Monkey Bridge", "The Monkey Illness")
 1930 – Ten Minutes of Mozart
 1931 – Harlekin
 1932 – Sissi
 1933 – Carmen
 1934 – The Stolen Heart
 1935 – The Seemingly Dead Chinese
 1935 – The Little Chimney Sweep
 1935 – Galathea: The Living Marblestatue
 1935 – Die Jagd nach dem Glück (Hunt for Luck)
 1935 – Kalif Storch
 1935 – Papageno
 1936 – Puss in Boots
 1937 – The Tocher. Film Ballet
 1938 – The HPO – Heavenly Post Office
 1944 – The Goose That Lays the Golden Eggs
 1951 – Mary's Birthday
 1953 – The Magic Horse
 1954 – Aladdin and the Magic Lamp
 1954 – Caliph Storch
 1954 – Cinderella
 1954 – Puss in Boots
 1954 – Snow White and Rose Red
 1954 – The Frog Prince
 1954 – The Gallant Little Tailor
 1954 – The Grasshopper and the Ant
 1954 – The Little Chimney Sweep
 1954 – The Sleeping Beauty
 1954 – The Three Wishes
 1954 – Thumbelina
 1955 – Hansel and Gretel
 1955 – Jack and the Beanstalk
 1961 – The Frog Prince
 1974 -  The Lost Son
 1975 – Aucassin and Nicolette
 1979 – The Rose and the Ring
 1980 – Die vier Jahreszeiten (The Four Seasons)

Other contributions 

 1930 – Chasing Fortune – co-writer
 1936 – Silhouettes – animation scenes
 1942 – Girl of the Golden West – co-writer

References

Bibliography
 Bendazzi, Giannalberto (Anna Taraboletti-Segre, translator). Cartoons: One Hundred Years of Cinema Animation. Indiana University Press.  (reprint, paperback, 2001).
 Cavalier, Steven. The world history of animation // Animation. Berkeley : University of California Press, 2011. 
 Crafton, Donald. Before Mickey: The Animated Film, 1898–1928. University of Chicago Press.  (2nd edition, paperback, 1993).
 Giesen, Rolf (2012). Animation Under the Swastika. Jefferson, NC: McFarland & Company, Inc. p. 200. .
 Kaes, Anton, Michael Cowan and Nicholas Baer, eds. (2016). The Promise of Cinema: German Film Theory, 1907–1933. Oakland: University of California Press. 
 Moritz, William. "Some Critical Perspectives on Lotte Reiniger." Animation Journal 5:1 (Fall 1996). 40–51.
 Leslie, Esther. Hollywood Flatlands: Animation, Critical Theory and the Avant-Garde. London: Verso, 2002. .
 Reiniger, Lotte. Shadow Theatres and Shadow Films. London: B.T. Batsford Ltd., 1970. Print.
 Schönfeld, Christiane. (2006). Practicing modernity : female creativity in the Weimar Republic. Würzburg : Königshausen & Neumann.

External links 

 
 "Lotte Reiniger's Silhouettes" by Abhijit Ghosh Dasitidar
 Essay on Reiniger by William Moritz (includes filmography)
 Profile of Reiniger at the Women Film Pioneers website
 "Lotte Reiniger" by Christine Ott 

1899 births
1981 deaths
German animated film directors
German animated film producers
Commanders Crosses of the Order of Merit of the Federal Republic of Germany
Film directors from Berlin
German women film directors
Stop motion animators
German animators
German women animators
Women film pioneers